"A Fool for You" is a bluesy, proto-soul single written and released by musician Ray Charles on Atlantic Records in 1955. The single was Charles' second number-one R&B hit.

Personnel
Lead vocal and piano by Ray Charles
Instrumentation by the Ray Charles band
Produced by Jerry Wexler

Covers
Ike & Tina Turner on The Ike & Tina Turner Show (Vol. 2)
Stevie Wonder on I Was Made To Love Her
Otis Redding on The Immortal Otis Redding
Van Morrison on A Night in San Francisco
Van Morrison on The Healing Game
Michael Jackson on Soulsation!

References

1955 singles
1955 songs
Ray Charles songs
Songs written by Ray Charles
Atlantic Records singles
Song recordings produced by Jerry Wexler
Ike & Tina Turner songs
Stevie Wonder songs
Otis Redding songs